Leonard Cyril Cornwell (28 March 1893 – 16 March 1971) was Archdeacon of Swindon from 1947 to 1963.

He was educated at Fitzwilliam College, Cambridge   and Ridley Hall, Cambridge and ordained in 1916. After further curacies in Chippenham and Bristol he held incumbencies  in Chippenham and Brinkworth.

References

1893 births
1971 deaths
Alumni of Fitzwilliam College, Cambridge
Alumni of Ridley Hall, Cambridge
Archdeacons of Swindon